Interstate 94 (I-94) runs east–west for  through the southern half of the US state of North Dakota, from the Montana state line east to the Red River at Fargo. The route generally follows the route of the Northern Pacific Railway.

Route description
Eastbound, the route enters from Montana just west of Beach and passes Dickinson, Bismarck, Jamestown, Valley City, and West Fargo before entering Fargo, where it exits the state at the Red River of the North and continues into Minnesota at Moorhead, then turns southeast to Minneapolis.

The route passes to the south of Theodore Roosevelt National Park's southern unit; access to the northern unit is by US Highway 85 (US 85) north from Belfield. Eastbound, I-94 changes timezones at the Stark–Morton county line southwest of Hebron. Mountain time (UTC−7) is observed in Stark County (and west) and Central time (UTC−6) in the rest of the state.

I-94 has two lanes in each direction through most of the state, expanding briefly to three lanes in each direction in the Bismarck–Mandan area (from exit 155 to 156) and in Fargo from 45th Street (exit 348) to the Red River of the North.

Points of interest

The route enters at Beach and passes through the badlands near Medora and the south unit of Theodore Roosevelt National Park. Further east, I-94 provides access to the north unit of the national park, then passes through the cities of Dickinson, Mandan–Bismarck, Jamestown, and Valley City on the way to West Fargo and Fargo, where it leaves the state and crosses into Minnesota.

Through North Dakota, I-94 travels nearly due east–west, generally following both the railroad route and the former route of US 10 (called "The Old Red Trail" or "The National Parks Trail") to exit 343 in West Fargo, where the current US 10 has its western terminus.

At New Salem, it passes Salem Sue, a  sculpture of a Holstein cow that is clearly visible on the south side of the highway; the road to Sue allows a vantage point to view a panoramic landscape. Between Mandan and Bismarck, I-94 crosses the Missouri River with a view of the Northern Pacific (now BNSF) Railway Bridge to the south. At Jamestown, it passes the world's largest sculpture of a buffalo (actually bison) named "Dakota Thunder",  in height and on the north of the highway.

The rivers that are west of this divide flow south into the Atlantic Ocean from the Gulf of Mexico, while the rivers that are east of the divide flow north into Hudson Bay. The James River, that flows through Jamestown, feeds into the Atlantic Ocean, while the Sheyenne River, that flows through Valley City ( east of Jamestown), feeds into Hudson Bay.

In Fargo, a well-known yet unnamed pedestrian bridge crosses over I-94; opened  in 1976, in time for the US Bicentennial. While providing a unique crossing for the surrounding neighborhoods, it serves as a landmark for commuters and travelers. Westbound, it is one of the first North Dakota landmarks visible from the highway.

History

Through the state, I-94 follows the route once taken by US 10 west from Fargo. This route was originally called "The Old Red Trail". 

I-94 roughly follows the route of the former Northern Pacific Railway mainline (now a BNSF Railway route) across North Dakota. Many of the towns and cities that I-94 serves first grew as railroad towns in the 19th and early 20th centuries.

The first section of I-94 completed with funds from the Federal-Aid Highway Act of 1956 was a  section between Jamestown and Valley City, North Dakota. It was opened on October 16, 1958, and cost $15 million (equivalent to $ in ) to construct. On October 7, 1964, a  section of I-94 between North Dakota Highway 25 and Fryburg was dedicated, with traffic permitted to use the section from New Salem to Dickinson.

Exit list

Spur routes
—a short spur route into Bismarck (Bismarck Expressway); unsigned

Business routes
 Medora Business Loop—Pacific Street
 Dickinson Business Loop—30th Avenue West, Villard Street, and 36th Street Southwest
 Mandan–Bismarck Business Loop—Business Loop 94, Main Street, Memorial Highway, Main Avenue, and Bismarck Expressway
 Valley City Business Loop—Main Street
 Fargo–Moorhead Business Loop—Main Avenue, 24th Avenue South, and 34th Street South

References

External links

NDDOT Road, Map, and Travel Information

 North Dakota
94
Transportation in Golden Valley County, North Dakota
Transportation in Billings County, North Dakota
Transportation in Stark County, North Dakota
Transportation in Morton County, North Dakota
Transportation in Burleigh County, North Dakota
Transportation in Kidder County, North Dakota
Transportation in Stutsman County, North Dakota
Transportation in Barnes County, North Dakota
Transportation in Cass County, North Dakota